The burial of James Takamore was a bicultural family conflict and legal precedent in New Zealand, reflecting the tension between Māori tikanga and English-based common law. James Takamore was born into the Whakatohea and Tūhoe iwi in the Bay of Plenty but lived as a Pākehā with his Pākehā wife in Christchurch, returning to the North Island only twice in 20 years and expressing to third parties his non-identification as Māori. A dispute arose whether he should be buried in Christchurch, as his wife intended, or in the traditional urupa (burial ground) of his family.

The Supreme Court ultimately upheld the common law principle that the executor of a deceased person's will had both the right and the duty to dispose of the deceased. The conflict was eventually resolved after court mediation in Christchurch though the details of the settlement have not been made public.

Dispute over burial
After his sudden death of an aneurysm in 2007, a dispute arose as to where he should be buried. Ngāi Tūhoe custom requires individuals bodies be returned to family urupa (burial site). Takamore had expressed a wish to be buried in Christchurch. His wife and executor of his will, Denise Clarke, also wished him to be buried in Christchurch.

The Takamore whānau travelled south to Christchurch for the tangihanga (funeral rite) which was to be held at Te Whare Roimata marae in Christchurch. Prior to the tangi, there was a confrontation at the funeral parlour, in which the Takamore whānau expressed a wish to return Takamore to his ancestral home; after the confrontation grew heated Clarke left. The Takamore whānau took the body north to the family urupa at Kutarere, in eastern Bay of Plenty. Clarke obtained a court order barring burial, but police arriving to enforce the court order found the burial already in progress and did not enforce it. The rationale given for burying in the urupa included:

[H]is [umbilical] cord is here, we can't stretch it to the South Island.
Ms Clarke should have fought harder to keep her partner in Christchurch and not left the marae when conversation between the two sides became heated. If she wanted her husband to stay there, she should have stayed there, irrespective of what happened.

High Court
The High Court ruled that Clarke had the right to determine where Takamore was to be buried, with the judge, John Fogarty, saying:

On the evidence I have heard, Tuhoe tikanga in its current form, has not adapted to accommodate a personal right on the part of an individual of Tuhoe descent, living outside tribal life, to make decisions for him or herself, or for their immediate family to make decisions on their own behalf, as to where his or her body is to be buried. This is not to say that Tuhoe tikanga may not adapt in that direction in the future. That, however, is a matter for Tuhoe and not a matter for this court.

Court of Appeal
The Takamore whānau appealed against the ruling. The Court of Appeal ruled for Clarke and the police were prepared to enforce an exhumation order.

Supreme Court
The Supreme Court heard the case on the grounds of: "whether the Court of Appeal was correct to hold that New Zealand law entitled the executrix to determine disposal of the body of the deceased and whether it was correct to hold that the executrix is entitled to take possession of the body of the deceased not withstanding its burial."

The result was a split decision confirming Clarke's rights to determine disposal of the body.

Confrontation 

An August 2014 attempt to enforce the Supreme Count decision was halted when police refused to use force to overcome considerable local resistance to the exhumation.

Mediation 

Multi-party mediation in June 2015 led to a resolution and settlement that has not been released.

The case led to new research on Māori customary burial practises, which had been dismissed by the Supreme Court with a 79-page judgement which acknowledged "significant cross-cultural misunderstanding" but upheld the common law rule.

Opinion
Opinion about the case is mixed, with a number siding with the Takamore whānau citing the United Nations Declaration on the Rights of Indigenous Peoples which gives indigenous people's traditional practices legal weight. The court decision explicitly considered the declaration.

Similar cases
A previous similar case involved Ngāpuhi descendant whose whānau tried to have his body returned from Otago to the Far North. There was also tension over the burial place of comedian Billy T. James.

Disputes over the disposition of bodies is not uncommon in cases of alleged domestic violence.

Further reading
CA 525/2009 Takamore v Clark decision from the Court of Appeal
Takamore v Clark decision from the Supreme Court of New Zealand
Ownership of tupapaku. Tomas, VC. New Zealand Law Journal 233-236 Jul 2008.
Who decides where a deceased person will be buried - takamore revisited. Tomas, Nin. Yearbook of New Zealand Jurisprudence Volume 11/12 (2008-2009).
The Treaty of Waiting and Maori Custom Law. Johnston, Kerensa. New Zealand Law Review 549 (2009).

References

Supreme Court of New Zealand cases
Māori
2012 in case law
2011 in New Zealand
2012 in New Zealand
2012 in New Zealand law